Castalia is the name of a nymph in Greek and Roman mythology.

Castalia or Kastalia may also refer to:

Places
 Castalia, Iowa, United States
 Castalia, Ohio, United States, a village in Erie County
 Castalia, North Carolina, United States, a town in Nash County
 Castalia, Grand Manan Island, Canada, part of the Village of Grand Manan
 Castalia, a spring at Daphne, Antioch

Astronomy
 4769 Castalia (previously known as '1989 PB'), a near-Earth asteroid discovered by Eleanor Helin in 1989; the first asteroid to be directly imaged
 646 Kastalia, a Main Belt asteroid discovered by August Kopff in 1907
 The Castalia meteorite of 1874, which fell in North Carolina, United States (see meteorite falls)
 A macula of Europa.

Music
 Castalia, an instrumental track in the 1979 album Solid State Survivor by Yellow Magic Orchestra
 Castalia (album), a Mark Isham album

Other uses
 Castalia (bivalve), a genus of bivalves in the family Hyriidae
 Castalia, a synonym for Nymphaea, a plant genus
 Castalia (spacecraft), a proposed European Space Agency space probe
 Castalia (simulator), a wireless network simulator
 Castalia, a fictional province in Hermann Hesse's The Glass Bead Game
, an experimental cross-Channel ferry which was later converted to a hospital ship
 Castalia House, a book publishing company founded by writer Vox Day

See also
 Nou Estadi Castàlia, a football stadium in Castelló de la Plana, Spain